Alfred Britton (21 February 1867 – 23 September 1904) was a South African cricketer. He played in five first-class matches for Eastern Province from 1889/90 to 1896/97.

See also
 List of Eastern Province representative cricketers

References

External links
 

1867 births
1904 deaths
South African cricketers
Eastern Province cricketers
Place of birth missing